Er Teck Hwa (born 17 December 1972) is a Malaysian politician. Er was the two-term Member of Parliament (MP) for the Bakri constituency in the State of Johor from 2008 to 2018. He is a member of the Democratic Action Party (DAP), a component party in the Pakatan Harapan (PH) coalition.

Early education
He started his primary education in SJK(C) Chung Hwa 2A, Muar. He continued his secondary education in SMK Jalan Junid, Muar, Johor.

Political career
In the 2008 general election, Er representing DAP had created history by winning the Bakri constituency to be the first MP from opposition, other than the governing Barisan Nasional (BN) coalition or its predecessor, the Alliance Party, from the Johor state ever elected to the Parliament of Malaysia since Independence. Upon his election, Er, a Mandarin speaker, stated that he was planning to hire private tutors to improve his Malay and English language skills to communicate more effectively with his constituents.

The Star columnist Lee Yuk Peng has said that Er has impacted parliament with his "efforts to bring issues close to the heart for parliamentary deliberation" and had the "reputation of being a hard working and dedicated MP" prepared to ask questions in parliament despite his lack of proficiency in Malay. Persistence paid off for Er when his second emergency motion on the accident involving an express bus was allowed to be debated in Parliament on 3 November 2010. He filed his first emergency motion on the fatal accident in Simpang Ampat on 14 October 2010 but it was dismissed on 18 October 2010. This was also the first emergency motion to be allowed in 2010 as most of them were rejected on the grounds that there was no urgency for the matters raised.

Er was successfully reelected again in the 2013 general election with a bigger majority for the second term. Somehow Er did not seek a third term reelection for his Bakri parliamentary seat in the 2018 general election to make way for Yeo Bee Yin, the former Selangor State Legislative Assemblywoman of Damansara Utama who successfully defended the seat for DAP.

Election results

See also
Bakri (federal constituency)

References

External links
 
 

Living people
1972 births
People from Johor
People from Muar
Malaysian politicians of Chinese descent
Malaysian Buddhists
Democratic Action Party (Malaysia) politicians
Members of the Dewan Rakyat
21st-century Malaysian politicians
Malaysian people of Teochew descent